Yulia Gordeeva (born 5 January 1988) is a Russian footballer. For most of her career, she played as a striker, but recently she changed position to play as a defender for Chertanovo Moscow and the Russia national team.

Club career
She played for Izmailovo Moscow in the Russian Women's Football Championship since 2010.

International career
She was called up to be part of the national team for the UEFA Women's Euro 2013.

Honours
Izmailovo Moscow
Runner-up
 Russian Women's Cup: 2013

References

External links
 
 
 
 Julia Gordeeva at fussballtransfers.com 
 Yulia Gordeeva at soccerdonna.de 

1988 births
Living people
Russian women's footballers
Footballers from Moscow
Russia women's international footballers
CSP Izmailovo players
Women's association football defenders
FC Chertanovo Moscow (women) players
Russian Women's Football Championship players